"Mala Mía" is a song by Colombian singer Maluma. It was released by Sony Music Latin on August 10, 2018. A remix version with Becky G and Anitta was released on December 21, 2018.

Charts

Certifications

References

2018 singles
2018 songs
Maluma songs
Songs written by Maluma (singer)
Songs written by Edgar Barrera
Becky G songs
Anitta (singer) songs